This is a list of events in the year 2017 in Equatorial Guinea.

Incumbents
 President: Teodoro Obiang Nguema Mbasogo 
 Prime Minister: Francisco Pascual Obama Asue

Events

Sport
4 to 13 August – Equatorial Guinea at the 2017 World Championships in Athletics

Deaths
1 July – Ibra Agbo, footballer (b. 1987).

References

 
2010s in Equatorial Guinea 
Years of the 21st century in Equatorial Guinea 
Equatorial Guinea 
Equatorial Guinea